Waste management industry, or waste industry for short, subsumes all industrial branches concerned with waste management, waste dumping, waste recycling and - to a lesser degree - waste prevention.

Within Germany, waste management has evolved into a large economic sector. There are more than 270,000 people working in some 11,000 companies with an annual turnover of around 70 billion euros (~$77,647,000,000). More than 15,500 waste management facilities help to conserve resources through recycling and other recovery operations. On a global scale, the market size is expected to reach $530.0 billion by 2025 from $330.6 billion in 2017, with a compound annual growth rate of 6.0%. The growth might even continue when, according to a World Bank report, global waste production will grow by 70% from 2018 to 2050, unless severe measures are taken.

Global players
Among the top companies in the sector are the following:
 Advanced Disposal Services
 Biffa
 Clean Harbors
 Covanta Holding Corporation
 Hitachi Zosen Corporation
 Remondis
 Republic Services
 Suez Environment
 Veolia Environment
 Waste Management, also the no. 1 in the USA

References

Waste industry
Industries (economics)